The Shingobee River is a river in Cass and Hubbard counties, Minnesota.

Shingobee is a name derived from an Ojibwe language word for a type of evergreen.

See also
List of rivers of Minnesota

References
Notes

Sources
Minnesota Watersheds
USGS Geographic Names Information Service
USGS Hydrologic Unit Map - State of Minnesota (1974)

Rivers of Cass County, Minnesota
Rivers of Hubbard County, Minnesota
Rivers of Minnesota